Samir Caetano de Souza Santos (born 5 December 1994), also known as Samir, is a Brazilian professional footballer who plays as a centre back for Liga MX club Tigres UANL.

Club career
Born in Rio de Janeiro, Samir began his career with Brazilian side Flamengo, making his Série A debut with the club's first team in 2013; he won the 2013 Copa do Brasil and the 2014 Campeonato Carioca with the club.

On 18 January 2016, he joined Italian club Udinese for €4.5 million, but was immediately loaned out to Verona for the remainder of the 2015–16 Serie A season.

On 4 April 2016, he made his Serie A debut, scoring the decisive goal in a 1–0 away win against Bologna from a header.

On 6 January 2022, Samir signed for English club Watford on a three and a half year deal for an undisclosed fee.

On 13 August 2022, Samir signed for Liga MX club Tigres UANL for an undisclosed fee.

International career
Samir was included in the Brazilian under-20 side for the 2013 South American Youth Football Championship. He has also represented Brazil at under-21 level.

Samir was included in the senior national team for the first time in August 16th 2019; for friendlies against Colombia and Peru in the following month.

Style of play
Samir is a large and physically powerful left-footed defender, who is known for his confidence, solid distribution, ability to read the game, and strength in the air, which makes him a goal threat on set-pieces in the opposition's area. Although primarily a centre-back, he is also capable of playing as a left-back or as a defensive midfielder.

Career statistics

Honours
Flamengo
Copa do Brasil: 2013
Campeonato Carioca: 2014

References

External links

1994 births
Living people
Brazilian footballers
Association football central defenders
Footballers from São Paulo
Brazil youth international footballers
Brazilian expatriate footballers
Campeonato Brasileiro Série A players
Serie A players
Premier League players
CR Flamengo footballers
Udinese Calcio players
Hellas Verona F.C. players
Watford F.C. players
Expatriate footballers in Italy
Brazilian expatriate sportspeople in Italy
Expatriate footballers in England
Brazilian expatriate sportspeople in England